Dead by April is a Swedish metal band from Gothenburg, formed in February 2007 by Pontus Hjelm and Jimmie Strimell. The band has released 4 studio albums, 1 compilation album, 7 music videos and 9 singles.

Albums

Studio albums

Compilation albums

Extended plays

Singles

As featured artist

Music videos

in Collapsing there where two fans Inari Räsänen and Ditte Rask

References

Discographies of Swedish artists